Mercury Browser is a discontinued freeware mobile browser for Android, developed by iLegendSoft. Mercury Browser uses the Webkit engine. It was formerly available for iOS, but in 2017, it was removed from the App Store.

Features
Mercury Browser supports tabbed browsing, where users can open and switch between web pages with multiple tabs either at the top of the display or a thumbnail at the bottom. The browser also supports over ten gestures for ten functions, a browser synchronization allowing the user to sync Mozilla Firefox or Google Chrome desktop bookmarks across devices, a private mode that stops the browser from recording the user's search history and cookies, integrated ad blocking, a night mode that dims the screen, and a reading view.

Adobe Flash is only supported in the Android version of the browser.

References

External links 

 Official website

Mobile web browsers
Android web browsers
Software based on WebKit